Richard Prentys (fl. 1390s - 1410s) was a Canon of Windsor from 1403 to 1404 and Dean of the Chapel Royal.

Career

He was appointed:
Prebendary of Seaford in Chichester 1398
Prebendary of the seventh stall in St Stephen's, Westminster 1395 - 1401
Prebendary of the third stall in St Stephen's, Westminster 1401 - 1404
Master of St Katharine's by the Tower 1402 - 1412
Prebendary of Stratford in Salisbury 1404
Prebendary of Grantham Australis in Salisbury 1406
Archdeacon of West Ham 1400 - 1406
Dean of the Chapel Royal 1403 - 1414

He was appointed to the sixth stall in St George's Chapel, Windsor Castle in 1403 and held the canonry until 1404.

Notes 

1509 deaths
Canons of Windsor
Archdeacons of West Ham
Deans of the Chapel Royal
Year of birth unknown